Amplify is an American independent film distributor founded in 2014. The company is the result of a merger between distributors GoDigital and Variance Films.

Amplify releases seven to ten films per year across major platforms. Variance Films and GoDigital will continue to operate as divisions of Amplify, merging digital rights and distribution automation processing under GoDigital's corporate sister, ContentBridge.

In 2015, GoDigital acquired the self-distribution platform Distribber.

Selected films

References 

American companies established in 2014
Film distributors of the United States
Video on demand services
2014 establishments in New York City